Astronomical symbols are abstract pictorial symbols used to represent astronomical objects, theoretical constructs and observational events in European astronomy. The earliest forms of these symbols appear in Greek papyrus texts of late antiquity. The Byzantine codices in which many Greek papyrus texts were preserved continued and extended the inventory of astronomical symbols. New symbols have been invented to represent many planets and minor planets discovered in the 18th to the 21st centuries.

These symbols were once commonly used by professional astronomers, amateur astronomers, alchemists, and astrologers. While they are still commonly used in almanacs and astrological publications, their occurrence in published research and texts on astronomy is relatively infrequent, with some exceptions such as the Sun and Earth symbols appearing in astronomical constants, and certain zodiacal signs used to represent the solstices and equinoxes.

Unicode has encoded many of these symbols, mainly in the Miscellaneous Symbols, Miscellaneous Symbols and Arrows, Miscellaneous Symbols and Pictographs,
and Alchemical Symbols blocks.



Symbols for the Sun and Moon 

The use of astronomical symbols for the Sun and Moon dates to antiquity. The forms of the symbols that appear in the original papyrus texts of Greek horoscopes are a circle with one ray for the Sun and a crescent for the Moon. The modern Sun symbol, a circle with a dot (☉), first appeared in Europe in the Renaissance.

In modern academic writing, the Sun symbol is used for astronomical constants relating to the Sun.

Symbols for the planets 

 
Symbols for the classical planets appear in many medieval Byzantine codices in which many ancient horoscopes were preserved. The written symbols for Mercury, Venus, Jupiter, and Saturn have been traced to forms found in late Greek papyrus texts. The symbols for Jupiter and Saturn are identified as monograms of the corresponding Greek names, and the symbol for Mercury is a stylized caduceus. According to A.S.D. Maunder, antecedents of the planetary symbols were used in art to represent the gods associated with the classical planets; Bianchini's planisphere, discovered by Francesco Bianchini in the 18th century, produced in the 2nd century, shows Greek personifications of planetary gods charged with early versions of the planetary symbols: Mercury has a caduceus; Venus has, attached to her necklace, a cord connected to another necklace; Mars, a spear; Jupiter, a staff; Saturn, a scythe; the Sun, a circlet with rays radiating from it; and the Moon, a headdress with a crescent attached.

A diagram in Byzantine astronomer Johannes Kamateros's 12th century Compendium of Astrology shows the Sun represented by the circle with a ray, Jupiter by the letter Zeta (the initial of Zeus, Jupiter's counterpart in Greek mythology), Mars by a shield crossed by a spear, and the remaining classical planets by symbols resembling the modern ones, without the cross-mark at the bottom of the modern versions of the symbols for Mercury and Venus. These cross-marks first appear around the 16th century. According to Maunder, the addition of crosses appears to be "an attempt to give a savour of Christianity to the symbols of the old pagan gods."

The symbols for Uranus were created shortly after its discovery. One symbol, invented by J. G. Köhler and refined by Bode, was intended to represent the newly discovered metal platinum; since platinum, commonly called white gold, was found by chemists mixed with iron, the symbol for platinum combines the alchemical symbols for the planetary elements iron, ♂, and gold, ☉. 
Another symbol, was suggested by Joseph Jérôme Lefrançois de Lalande in 1784. In a letter to William Herschel, Lalande described it as "un globe surmonté par la première lettre de votre nom" ("a globe surmounted by the first letter of your name"). Today, Köhler's symbol is more common among astronomers, and Lalande's among astrologers, although it is not uncommon to see each symbol in the other context.

Several symbols were proposed for Neptune to accompany the suggested names for the planet. Claiming the right to name his discovery, Urbain Le Verrier originally proposed the name Neptune and the symbol of a trident, while falsely stating that this had been officially approved by the French Bureau des Longitudes. In October, he sought to name the planet Leverrier, after himself, and he had loyal support in this from the observatory director, François Arago, who in turn proposed a new symbol for the planet. However, this suggestion met with stiff resistance outside France. French almanacs quickly reintroduced the name Herschel for Uranus, after that planet's discoverer Sir William Herschel, and Leverrier for the new planet. Professor James Pillans of the University of Edinburgh defended the name Janus for the new planet, and proposed a key for its symbol. Meanwhile, German-Russian astronomer Friedrich Georg Wilhelm von Struve presented the name Neptune on December 29, 1846, to the Saint Petersburg Academy of Sciences. In August 1847, the Bureau des Longitudes announced its decision to follow prevailing astronomical practice and adopt the choice of Neptune, with Arago refraining from participating in this decision.

The International Astronomical Union discourages the use of these symbols in journal articles, though they do occur. In certain cases where planetary symbols might be used, such as in the headings of tables, the IAU Style Manual permits certain one- and (to disambiguate Mercury and Mars) two-letter abbreviations for the names of the planets.

{| class="wikitable" style="text-align: center;"
|+ Planets
|-
! scope="col" | Planet !! scope="col" | IAUabbreviation !! scope="col" | Symbol !! scope="col" | Unicodecode point !! scope="col" | Unicodedisplay !! scope="col" | Represents
|-
| scope="row" | Mercury
| H, Me
| align=center | 
| U+263F
| 
| style="text-align: left;" | Mercury's caduceus, with a cross
|-
| scope="row" | Venus
| V
| align=center | 
| U+2640
| 
| style="text-align: left;" | Perhaps Venus's necklace or a (copper) hand mirror, with a cross
|-
| scope="row" rowspan="2" | Earth
| rowspan="2" | E
| align=center | 
| U+1F728
| 
| style="text-align: left;" | the four quadrants of the world, divided by the four rivers descending from Eden
|-
| align=center | 
| U+2641
| 
| style="text-align: left;" | a globus cruciger
|-
| scope="row" | Mars
| M, Ma
| align=center | 
| U+2642
| 
| style="text-align: left;" | Mars's shield and spear
|-
| scope="row" | Jupiter
| J
| align=center | 
| U+2643
| 
| style="text-align: left;" | the letter Zeta with an abbreviation stroke (for Zeus, the Greek equivalent to the Roman god Jupiter)
|-
| scope="row" | Saturn
| S
| align=center | 
| U+2644
| 
| style="text-align: left;" | the letters kappa-rho with an abbreviation stroke (for Kronos, the Greek equivalent to the Roman god Saturn), with a cross
|-
| scope="row" rowspan=2| Uranus
|rowspan=2| U
|align=center| 
| U+26E2
| 
| style="text-align: left;" | symbol of the recently described element platinum, which was invented to provide a symbol for Uranus
|-
| align=center | 
| U+2645
| 
| style="text-align: left;" | a globe surmounted by the letter H (for Herschel, who discovered Uranus)(more common in older or British literature)
|-
| scope="row" rowspan=2|Neptune
| rowspan=2|N
| align=center | 
| U+2646
| 
| style="text-align: left;" | Neptune's trident
|-
| align=center | 
| U+2BC9
| 
| style="text-align: left;" | a globe surmounted by the letters "L" and "V", (for Le Verrier, who discovered Neptune)(more common in older, especially French, literature)
|}

Symbols for asteroids

Following the discovery of Ceres in 1801 by the astronomer and Catholic priest Giuseppe Piazzi, a group of astronomers ratified the name, which Piazzi had proposed. At that time, the sickle was chosen as a symbol of the planet.

The symbol for 2 Pallas, the spear of Pallas Athena, was invented by Baron Franz Xaver von Zach, who organized a group of twenty-four astronomers to search for a planet between the orbits of Mars and Jupiter. The symbol was introduced by von Zach in 1802.
In a letter to von Zach, discoverer Heinrich Wilhelm Matthäus Olbers (who had discovered and named Pallas) expressed his approval of the proposed symbol, but wished that the handle of the sickle of Ceres had been adorned with a pommel instead of a crossbar, to better differentiate it from the sign of Venus.

German astronomer Karl Ludwig Harding created the symbol for 3 Juno. Harding, who discovered this asteroid in 1804, proposed the name Juno and the use of a scepter topped with a star as its astronomical symbol.

The symbol for 4 Vesta was invented by German mathematician Carl Friedrich Gauss. Dr. Olbers, having previously discovered and named 2 Pallas, gave Gauss the honor of naming his newest discovery. Gauss decided to name the new asteroid for the goddess Vesta, and also designed the symbol: the altar of the goddess, with the sacred fire burning on it. Other contemporaneous writers use a more elaborate symbol instead.

Karl Ludwig Hencke, a German amateur astronomer, discovered the next two asteroids, 5 Astraea (in 1845) and 6 Hebe (in 1847). Hencke requested that the symbol for 5 Astraea be an upside-down anchor; however, a weighing scale was sometimes used instead. Gauss named 6 Hebe at Hencke's request, and chose a wineglass as the symbol.

As more new asteroids were discovered, astronomers continued to assign symbols to them. Thus, 7 Iris had for its symbol a rainbow with a star; 8 Flora, a flower; 9 Metis, an eye with a star; 10 Hygiea, an upright snake with a star on its head; 11 Parthenope, a standing fish with a star; 12 Victoria, a star topped with a branch of laurel; 13 Egeria, a buckler; 14 Irene, a dove carrying an olive branch with a star on its head; 15 Eunomia, a heart topped with a star; 16 Psyche, a butterfly wing with a star; 17 Thetis, a dolphin with a star; 18 Melpomene, a dagger over a star; and 19 Fortuna, a star over Fortuna's wheel.

In most cases the discovery reports only describe the symbols and do not draw them. The discovery reports for Melpomene and Fortuna do not even describe the symbols; the symbols are drawn in the reports for Astraea, Hebe, and Thetis. Benjamin Apthorp Gould criticised the symbols in 1852 as being often inefficient at suggesting the bodies they represented and difficult to draw, and pointed out that the symbol that had been described for Irene had to his knowledge never actually been drawn.

The last edition of the Berliner Astronomisches Jahrbuch (BAJ, Berlin Astronomical Yearbook) to use asteroid symbols was for the year 1853, published in 1850: although it includes eleven asteroids up to Parthenope, it only includes symbols for the first nine (up to Metis), noting that the symbols for Hygiea and Parthenope had not yet been made definitively known. The last edition of the British The Nautical Almanac and Astronomical Ephemeris to include asteroid ephemerides was that for 1855, published in 1852: despite fifteen asteroids being known (up to Eunomia), symbols are only included for the first nine.

Johann Franz Encke made a major change in the BAJ for the year 1854, published in 1851. He introduced encircled numbers instead of symbols, although his numbering began with Astraea, the first four asteroids continuing to be denoted by their traditional symbols. This symbolic innovation was adopted very quickly by the astronomical community. The following year (1852), Astraea's number was bumped up to 5, but Ceres through Vesta were not listed by their numbers until the 1867 edition. The Astronomical Journal edited by Gould adopted the symbolism in this form, with Ceres at 1 and Astraea at 5. The circle later became a pair of parentheses, and the parentheses were sometimes omitted altogether over the next few decades.

A few asteroids were given symbols by their discoverers after the encircled-number notation became widespread. 26 Proserpina, 28 Bellona, 35 Leukothea, and 37 Fides, all discovered by German astronomer Robert Luther between 1853 and 1855, were assigned, respectively, a pomegranate with a star inside; a whip and spear; an antique lighthouse; and a cross. These symbols were drawn in the discovery reports. 29 Amphitrite was named and assigned a shell for its symbol by George Bishop, the owner of the observatory where astronomer Albert Marth discovered it in 1854, though the symbol was not drawn in the discovery report.

All these symbols are rare or obsolete in modern astronomy. The major use of symbols for minor planets today is by astrologers, who have invented symbols for many more objects, though they sometimes use symbols that differ from the historical symbols for the same bodies. The astrological symbols for 4 Vesta, 5 Astraea, and 10 Hygiea, that are relatively standard among astrologers but differ from the historical astronomical symbols, are included below for reference as they are in Unicode.

Symbols for trans-Neptunian objects 
Pluto's name and symbol were announced by the discoverers on May 1, 1930. 
The symbol, a monogram of the letters PL, could be interpreted to stand for Pluto or for Percival Lowell, the astronomer who initiated Lowell Observatory's search for a planet beyond the orbit of Neptune. Pluto has an alternative symbol consisting of a planetary orb over Pluto's bident: it is more common in astrology than astronomy, and was popularised by the astrologer Paul Clancy, but has been used by NASA to refer to Pluto as a dwarf planet. There are a few other astrological symbols for Pluto that are used locally. Pluto also had the IAU abbreviation P when it was considered the ninth planet.

The other large trans-Neptunian objects were only discovered around the dawn of the 21st century. They were not generally thought to be planets on their discovery, and planetary symbols had in any case mostly fallen out of use among astronomers by then. Denis Moskowitz, a software engineer in Massachusetts, proposed astronomical symbols for the dwarf planets Quaoar, Sedna, Orcus, Haumea, Eris, Makemake, and Gonggong. These symbols are somewhat standard among astrologers (e.g. in the program Astrolog), which is where planetary symbols are most used today. Moskowitz has also proposed symbols for Varuna, Ixion, and Salacia, and others have done so for additional TNOs, but there is little consistency between sources.

NASA has used Moskowitz's symbols for Haumea, Makemake, and Eris in an astronomical context, and Unicode labels the symbols for Haumea, Makemake, Gonggong, Quaoar, and Orcus (added to Unicode in 2022) as "astronomy symbols". Therefore, symbols mentioned in the Unicode proposal for Haumea, Makemake, Gonggong, Quaoar, and Orcus have been shown below to fill out the list of named TNOs down to 600 km diameter, even though not all of them are actually attested in astronomical use. (Grundy et al. suggest 600 to 700 km diameter as a speculative upper limit for a trans-Neptunian object to retain substantial pore space.)

Symbols for zodiac and other constellations 

The zodiac symbols have several astronomical interpretations. Depending on context, a zodiac symbol may denote either a constellation, or a point or interval on the ecliptic plane.

Lists of astronomical phenomena published by almanacs sometimes included conjunctions of stars and planets or the Moon; rather than print the full name of the star, a Greek letter and the symbol for the constellation of the star was sometimes used instead.
The ecliptic was sometimes divided into 12 signs, each subdivided into 30 degrees,
and the sign component of ecliptic longitude was expressed either with a number from 0 to 11. or with the corresponding zodiacal symbol.

In modern astronomical writing, all the constellations, including the twelve of the zodiac, have dedicated three-letter abbreviations, which specifically refer to constellations rather than signs.
The zodiac symbols are also sometimes used to represent points on the ecliptic, particularly the solstices and equinoxes. Each symbol is taken to represent the "first point" of each sign, rather than the place in the visible constellation where the alignment is observed.
Thus, ♈︎ the symbol for Aries, represents the March equinox;
♋︎, for Cancer, the June solstice;
♎︎, for Libra, the September equinox;
and ♑︎, for Capricorn, the December solstice.

Although the use of astrological sign symbols is rare, the particular symbol ♈︎ for Aries, is an exception; it is commonly used in modern astronomy to represent the location of the (slowly) moving reference point for the ecliptic and equatorial celestial coordinate systems.

{| class="wikitable"  style="text-align: center;"
|+ Zodiacal symbols
|- 
!scope="col"| Constellation
!scope="col"| IAUabbreviation
!scope="col"| Number
!scope="col"| Astrologicallocation
!scope="col"| Symbol
!scope="col"| Translation
!scope="col"| Unicodecode point
!scope="col"| Unicodedisplay
|- 
|scope="row"| Aries
| Ari
| 0
| 0°
| 
| ram
| U+2648
| 
|- 
|scope="row"| Taurus
| Tau
| 1
| 30°
| 
| bull
| U+2649
| 
|- 
|scope="row"| Gemini
| Gem
| 2
| 60°
| 
| twinned
| U+264A
| 
|- 
|scope="row"| Cancer
| Cnc
| 3
| 90°
| 
| crab
| U+264B
| 
|- 
|scope="row"| Leo
| Leo
| 4
| 120°
| 
| lion
| U+264C
| 
|- 
|scope="row"| Virgo
| Vir
| 5
| 150°
| 
| maiden
| U+264D
| 
|- 
|scope="row"| Libra
| Lib
| 6
| 180°
| 
| scales
| U+264E
| 
|- 
|scope="row"| Scorpio
| Sco
| 7
| 210°
| 
| scorpion
| U+264F
| 
|-
|scope="row"| Sagittarius
| Sgr
| 8
| 240°
| 
| archer
| U+2650
| 
|- 
|scope="row"| Capricorn
| Cap
| 9
| 270°
|  
| having a goat's horns
| U+2651
| 
|- 
|scope="row"| Aquarius
| Aqr
| 10
| 300°
| 
| water-carrier
| U+2652
| 
|- 
|scope="row"| Pisces
| Psc
| 11
| 330°
| 
| fishes
| U+2653
| 
|}

Ophiuchus has been proposed as a thirteenth sign of the zodiac by astrologer Walter Berg in 1995, who gave it a symbol that has become popular in Japan.

{| class="wikitable" style="text-align: center;"
|- 
!scope="col"| Constellation
!scope="col"| IAUabbreviation
!scope="col"| Symbol
!scope="col"| Translation
!scope="col"| Unicodecode point
!scope="col"| Unicodedisplay
|- 
|scope="row"| Ophiuchus
| Oph
| 
| the Serpent-holder
| U+26CE
| 
|}

None of the constellations have official symbols. However, occasional symbols for the modern constellations, as well as older ones that occur in modern nomenclature, have appeared in publication. The symbols below were devised by Denis Moskowitz (except those for the thirteen constellations already listed above).

 Andromeda 
 Antlia 
 Apus 
 Aquarius 
 Aquila 
 Ara 
 Argo Navis 
 Aries 
 Auriga 
 Boötes 
 Caelum 
 Camelopardalis 
 Cancer 
 Canes Venatici 
 Canis Major 
 Canis Minor 
 Capricornus 
 Carina 
 Cassiopeia 
 Centaurus 
 Cepheus 
 Cetus 
 Chamaeleon 
 Circinus 
 Columba 
 Coma Berenices 
 Corona Australis 
 Corona Borealis 
 Corvus 
 Crater 
 Crux 
 Cygnus 
 Delphinus 
 Dorado 
 Draco 
 Equuleus 
 Eridanus 
 Fornax 
 Gemini 
 Grus 
 Hercules 
 Horologium 
 Hydra 
 Hydrus 
 Indus 
 Lacerta 
 Leo 
 Leo Minor 
 Lepus 
 Libra 
 Lupus 
 Lynx 
 Lyra 
 Mensa 
 Microscopium 
 Monoceros 
 Musca 
 Norma 
 Octans 
 Ophiuchus 
 Orion 
 Pavo 
 Pegasus 
 Perseus 
 Phoenix 
 Pictor 
 Pisces 
 Piscis Austrinus 
 Puppis 
 Pyxis 
 Quadrans Muralis 
 Reticulum 
 Sagitta 
 Sagittarius 
 Scorpius 
 Sculptor 
 Scutum 
 Serpens 
 Serpens Cauda 
 Serpens Caput 
 Sextans 
 Taurus 
 Telescopium 
 Triangulum 
 Triangulum Australe 
 Tucana 
 Ursa Major 
 Ursa Minor 
 Vela 
 Virgo 
 Volans 
 Vulpecula

Other symbols 
Symbols for aspects and nodes appear in medieval texts, although medieval and modern usage of the node symbols differ; the modern ascending node symbol (☊) formerly stood for the descending node, and the modern descending node symbol (☋) was used for the ascending node. In describing the Keplerian elements of an orbit, ☊ is sometimes used to denote the ecliptic longitude of the ascending node, although it is more common to use Ω (capital omega, and inverted ℧), which were originally typographical substitutes for the astronomical symbols.

The symbols for aspects first appear in Byzantine codices. Of the symbols for the five Ptolemaic aspects, only the three displayed here — for conjunction, opposition, and quadrature — are used in astronomy.

Symbols for a comet (☄) and a star have been used in published astronomical observations of comets.

{| class="wikitable" style="text-align: center;"
|+ Other symbols
|- 
!scope="col"| Referent
!scope="col"| Symbol
!scope="col"| Unicodecode point
!scope="col"| Unicodedisplay
|- 
|scope="row"| ascending node
| 
| U+260A
| 
|- 
|scope="row"| descending node
| 
| U+260B
| 
|- 
| scope="row" | conjunction
| 
| U+260C
| 
|- 
|scope="row"| opposition
| 
| U+260D
| 
|- 
|scope="row"| occultation
| 
| U+1F775
| 
|- 
|scope="row"| lunar eclipse
| 
| U+1F776
| 
|- 
|scope="row"| quadrature
| 
| U+25A1, U+25FB
| , 
|- 
|scope="row"| comet
|  
| U+2604
| 
|- 
|scope="row"| star
| 
| (various)
|  
|-
| planetary rings(rare)
| 
| 
| 

|}

See also

Astrological symbols
Alchemical symbols
Maya calendar for the logograms used in Maya astronomy
Solar symbol
Zodiac

Footnotes

References

 
Symbols, astronomical
Astronomy
Heraldic charges